Qajar Ab and Qajarab may refer to:
 Qajar Ab-e Olya
 Qajar Ab-e Sofla